The Talagi Pictograph Cave is a rock art site on the island of Guam.  It is located on property owned by the government of Guam within the bounds of Andersen Air Force Base on the northern part of the island near Tarague Beach.  The cave contains thirteen pictographs (painted shapes) representing human figures, and a places where limestone mortar was used that is of prehistoric origin.  Based on the characteristics of the figures, it is believed that they were probably the work of a single individual.  It is one of a small number (fewer than ten) known rock art sites on the island.

The cave was listed on the National Register of Historic Places in 2004.

See also
National Register of Historic Places listings in Guam

References

Archaeological sites on the National Register of Historic Places in Guam
Rock art of Oceania
Yigo, Guam